Silvana Sconciafurno (born 27 November 1941) is an Italian fencer. She competed in the women's team foil event at the 1968 Summer Olympics.

References

1941 births
Living people
Italian female fencers
Olympic fencers of Italy
Fencers at the 1968 Summer Olympics
Sportspeople from Tunis
People from Tunis